Scutellonema cavenessi is a plant pathogenic nematode.  This parasite destroys peanuts and soybeans.

References

External links 
 Nemaplex, University of California - Scutellonema
  Information on S. cavenessi

Tylenchida
Soybean diseases
Plant pathogenic nematodes